The yellowish myotis (Myotis levis), is a vesper bat species from South America. It is found in Argentina, Brazil, Paraguay, and Uruguay.

Dinelli's myotis (M. dinellii) was formerly considered a subspecies of M. levis, but was split as a distinct species by a 2013 study, which found significant genetic and morphological differences between both taxa.

References

Mouse-eared bats
Mammals described in 1806
Taxa named by Étienne Geoffroy Saint-Hilaire
Bats of South America